Agyneta castanea is a species of sheet weaver found in Chile. It was described by Millidge in 1991.

References

castanea
Spiders described in 1991
Spiders of South America
Fauna of Chile
Endemic fauna of Chile